The Cultural Union for the Friendship of the Peoples is a nonprofit entity based in the city of São Paulo, Brasil.

Initially named Brazil–Soviet Union Cultural Union, it was founded on May 10, 1960 by a large number of Brazilian intellectuals, emphasizing the following ones: writer Sergio Milliet (its first President), doctor Joao Belline Burza, judge Decio de Arruda Campos, lawyer Aldo Lins e Silva, engineer Lucas Nogueira Garcez, writer Caio Prado Junior, writer Helena Silveira, poet Afonso Schimidt, professor Omar Catunda, painter Clovis Graciano, sociologist Florestan Fernandes, among others.

During its existence, it has always been a bridge for the cultural exchange between Brazil and the peoples of the Soviet Union by teaching Russian language in Brazil; or promoting shipment of Brazilian students for university education at Patrice Lumumba University, Moscow University, among other schools of that country; or even encouraging tourism between the two countries.

With the dissolution of the Soviet Union and wanting expanding the scope of its cultural relations in Assembly meeting held on 22 February 1997, the name of the entity was altered to Union Cultural by the Friendship of the People.

Nowadays, besides teaching Russian language, the entity also offers Spanish and Chinese mandarin courses.

References 

Brazil–Soviet Union relations
Foreign relations of Brazil
Foreign relations of Russia
Soviet Union friendship associations
Organisations based in São Paulo

es:Unión Cultural por la Amistad de los Pueblos